TeleNorba or Telenorba Shqiptare or simply TNSH (now ABC News) is a defunct private Albanian TV channel from Tirana, Albania launched in 1996 and owned by the Bari, Italy based TeleNorba Italia broadcaster. Originally, the channel was owned by Italian businessmen, then a Greek businessman, and finally by Albanian media mogul Aleksander Frangaj. The channel used to be available via analogue in central Albania, and later on satellite in Europe on the Albanian TV package DigitAlb.

Traditionally, the channel broadcast a variety of programming but its core focus remained news programming, cartoons, and soap operas from the Italian version of Telenorba based in Bari, Italy. In 2002, it was ranked fourth with 11.3% audience share. TeleNorba was the only affiliated channel to TV Klan which had the right to broadcast Njerez te humbur (Missing people) but did not hold the rights to broadcast the program live. Indeed, the program debuted on TNSH. On October 25, 2010, after some successful take overs from imminent bankruptcy, the channel was rebranded to ABC News.

History 
Due to the success of Italian media worldwide and their reach in Albania, the broadcaster decided to launch a new channel called Telenorba which would broadcast Italian programming to Albanian audiences. The ownership was made up of Italian and Albanian businessmen and a private company. Afterwards, it rebranded to "TeleNorba Shqiptare or TNSH" while programmes started to be subtitled in the Albanian language. Colpo Grosso, a late night adult show became a huge success together with soap operas from Latin America. The channel gained popularity and was able to expand its range of programing to include many Albanian programs, and a high-profile news bulletin. At midnight, TNSH used to simulcast the Italian version of the channel.

Satellite broadcasting 
Despite having been one of the youngest channels created by the TeleNorba company, TeleNorba Shqiptare was the only channel to broadcast by satellite in Europe.

Logo
The first logo was a white 'TN' symbol taken from the original Telenorba channel in Italy. An amber version followed, while later the letters 'SH' denoting "Shqiptare" were added as the colors were changed to transparent blue letters on white background. Finally, the logo was replaced with the transparent logo of the existing Italian channel.

References

External links
Morning show at TNSH 
TNSH simulcasting with Frangaj's TV Klan after the acquisition
Main news at telenorba.it in 2003

Direct broadcast satellite services
Defunct television networks in Albania

Television channels and stations disestablished in 2010